The Sinestro Corps, occasionally known as the Yellow Lantern Corps, is a supervillainous analog to the Green Lantern Corps in the DC Universe. Their power is derived from the emotional electromagnetic spectrum of fear; the corps is led by the supervillain Sinestro.

Publication history
The Sinestro Corps first appears in Green Lantern vol. 4 #10 and was created by Geoff Johns and Ethan Van Sciver.

Fictional history

Before the Corps

The Parallax entity is a space parasite that is the embodiment of fear that was imprisoned within the Central Power Battery on Oa. As time passed, the entity became known as the yellow impurity, the cause for the power rings' weakness to the color yellow.

Thaal Sinestro, at the time the universe's greatest Green Lantern, was sent to Earth by Supernova in a plot to erase Guy Gardner from history. Booster Gold was assigned to prevent this from happening. To do so, he convinced Sinestro to leave Earth, claiming that he was an admirer from the future, and that his yellow Legion of Super-Heroes flight ring was a tribute to Sinestro. When asked what Corps he belongs to, Booster ad-libbed, "The...Sinestro Corps", leading Sinestro to twirl his mustache in thought while mumbling, "Of course...Of course."

After Sinestro went rogue, he was banished by the Guardians of the Universe to Qward in the antimatter universe. When he returned, he wielded a power ring which used yellow energy. After various encounters with Earth's Green Lantern, Hal Jordan, he was imprisoned within the Central Power Battery. There he was able to use his ring, which uses fear, as opposed to willpower, as a power source, to awaken Parallax from hibernation. From there, Parallax and Sinestro were able to influence the fall of Hal Jordan and instigate the fall of the Green Lantern Corps, leaving one last Green Lantern: Kyle Rayner.

Recruitment drive

After the Green Lantern Corps was restarted with the return of Hal Jordan, the Sinestro Corps began actively recruiting members, offering yellow power rings and a role in the Corps to those who can "instill great fear". Members of the Corps are immediately taken to Qward to "...be subjected to psychological and physical reconditioning". The members of the Sinestro Corps work in sectors, like the Green Lantern Corps. Qward also has a huge yellow Central Battery on its surface like the one used on Oa. Although the Sinestro Corps uses fear, and opposes the Green Lantern Corps and the Guardians, Sinestro has stated their goal is to bring order to the universe, which he claims the Guardians have failed to do.

Arkillo, a large and muscular vicious alien, is enslaving all the Qwardian Weaponers and forcing them to continuously build new yellow rings which are programmed to breach the barrier between the antimatter and matter universes to find and recruit new ring-wielders. Arkillo also serves as the Sinestro Corps' drill sergeant, similar to Kilowog's role in the GLC.

Members recruited include Karu-Sil, raised by animals; Despotellis, a sentient virus capable of attacking Lanterns from the inside; and Bedovian, the sniper of the Corps, capable of taking out a target from three sectors away.

During this time, the Sinestro Corps attempted to recruit Batman, known even to some alien races for his formidable ability to instill fear in others. However, Batman's willpower combined with his previous brief exposure to a power ring allowed him to reject the yellow ring before it took him to be properly trained and molded into one of Sinestro's soldiers. The yellow ring then sought a replacement and selected Amon Sur, the disgruntled son of Abin Sur, who was on Earth attempting to steal Hal Jordan's ring.

The prophecy
It was revealed that after untold millennia, the Weaponers of Qward, Ranx the Sentient City, the Children of the White Lobe, and the Empire of Tears will rise united against the Green Lantern Corps. This was largely ignored up until upgraded Manhunters started to appear throughout the universe. Hal Jordan encountered one on Earth and, with Guy Gardner, followed their trail to Sector 3601. Hal and Guy found several Green Lanterns, all of whom were assumed to have been killed during the Emerald Twilight saga, and the Manhunters' new grandmaster Hank Henshaw, the Cyborg Superman. The Manhunters were defeated and Henshaw's head was brought to Oa. The Book of Oa has a forbidden chapter on cosmic prophecies, which includes the following:

After his interrogation, the Guardians learned that Henshaw is aware of the main fifty-two parallel universes focused on in the New 52 era and that if New Earth was destroyed, the new Multiverse would collapse and the Antimatter universe would take its place. Two of the Guardians, Ganthet and Sayd, warn the other Guardians not to ignore the prophecy because it could destroy the Green Lantern Corps.

The Sinestro Corps War

Following his defeat in Green Lantern: Rebirth, the events of Green Lantern: Sinestro Corps Special #1 Sinestro retreats to the planet Qward in the antimatter universe. There he amasses an army, the Sinestro Corps, that he selects based upon their ability to "inspire great fear". Each member is armed with a yellow power ring, mirroring the green ones of the Green Lantern Corps. Amongst Sinestro's allies are Parallax and the resurrected Anti-Monitor. The Sinestro Corps then launches an all-out assault against the Green Lantern Corps and the universe itself. During the assault on Oa, the Sinestro Corps manages to inflict heavy casualties and free Superman-Prime and the Cyborg Superman from their imprisonment. Kyle Rayner is captured and transported to Qward, where Sinestro manages to separate Rayner from the symbiote Ion allowing Parallax to possess him. Hal Jordan, John Stewart, and Guy Gardner return to Earth to warn the Justice League of the Anti-Monitor's return.

As the Sinestro Corps spreads out to ambush Green Lanterns across the universe, Green Lantern vol. 4 #23 sees the Guardians deciding to rewrite their sacred text, the Book of Oa. They add 10 new laws, the first of which authorizes the use of lethal force against the Sinestro Corps. As the Green Lanterns gather on Oa in preparation for a Sinestro Corps assault, the Sinestro Corps teleport themselves and their Central Power Battery instead to a new Warworld, their objective revealed to be Earth. Events in Green Lantern Corps vol. 2 #16 show Hal informing the Green Lantern Corps of Sinestro's plans.

Green Lantern vol. 4 #24 continues the story, with Green Lanterns and Sinestro Corps members battling across Earth. Hal manages to free Kyle from Parallax before the entity is imprisoned in their power batteries by Ganthet and Sayd. After John and Guy arrive, the former Guardians reveal to them the prophecy of the "Blackest Night", seen in Green Lantern vol. 4 #25. It foretells of five more Corps arising, each based on a different color and emotion. After the five corps are established, a "War of Light" will ensue, in which all the corps are destroyed, leading to the "Blackest Night".

The Guardians arrive on Earth and appoint Sodam Yat to be the new Ion. After a lengthy struggle in New York City, the Sinestro Corps are defeated by the overwhelming numbers against them. One of the Guardians sacrifices himself to send Superman-Prime to an alternate universe, while Hal and Kyle subdue and arrest Sinestro in Coast City. In the aftermath of the battle, seen in Green Lantern vol. 4 #25, the Guardians decide to bring the second of the new laws into effect. After realizing that the "Blackest Night" prophecy will come to pass, Ganthet and Sayd depart after creating a blue power ring with the intention of creating their own Corps, based on the spreading of Hope to the rest of the universe. The Anti-Monitor, having been blown across the vacuum of space at the battle's climax, finds itself on a dark planet. There it is transformed by an unknown force into a Black Power Battery.

Blackest Night

Following the Sinestro Corps War, the Green Lantern Corps tracked down the abandoned Sinestro rings and prevented them from finding new bearers. Among these is Amon Sur's ring, which attempts to recruit the self-proclaimed "Master of Fear", Jonathan Crane. The surviving members of the Sinestro Corps continue to try to bring fear to the Green Lanterns, in part by murdering the family members of Green Lanterns. Meanwhile, Mongul (who had since obtained a yellow ring in the aftermath of the war) begins his quest to take command of the Sinestro Corps in their namesake's absence. After obtaining an additional five rings by killing corpsmen who refused to follow him, Mongul takes over the planet Daxam and then a large contingent of the Sinestro Corps, after besting Arkillo in one-on-one combat, he becomes the new leader of the Sinestro Corps. In "Rage of the Red Lanterns" #1, a group of rogue Sinestro Corps members still loyal to Sinestro release him from Green Lantern custody as he is being transferred for execution. Their rescue attempt is temporarily spoiled by an attack from Atrocitus and his newly formed Red Lantern Corps.

Sinestro is abducted by Atrocitus' forces and brought to the Red Lantern base planet: Ysmault. Planning to use Sinestro's blood for their own means, Sinestro's faction of the Sinestro Corps eventually arrive and liberate him from the Red Lanterns. After their escape, Sinestro and his faction of the Sinestro Corps return to Qward, revealing that there is a backup Central Power Battery. Sinestro orders his men to free the Sinestro Corps members imprisoned on Zamaron by the Star Sapphires and meet him on the darkside of Daxam's moon. After Sinestro attends to "family business", they will retake the Sinestro Corps from Mongul. In addition to those members imprisoned on Zamaron, Sinestro Corps members are also being held prisoner on Oa. Their power rings are held in containment along with other rings (abandoned due to casualty in war) that were prevented from finding new bearers. When Red Lantern Vice is freed from confinement in his , he attacks the Green Lantern jailer. Though the imprisoned members of the Sinestro Corps initially cheer him on, they find that he is just as likely of attacking them in his rage. Upon being reunited with her ring, Lyssa Drak claims to once again be able to feel the Book of Parallax. Now armed with their rings the Sinestro Corps join in the battle with the Green Lanterns and Vice.

The faction of the Sinestro Corps led by Sinestro are planning an invasion of Zamaron, homeworld of the Star Sapphires, in order to retake the female Corps members being held prisoner there. After being repelled from Daxam, Mongul's faction (which he has renamed as "The Mongul Corps") invades Korugar. Sinestro's rescue attempt is interrupted by a Black Lantern attack, which he only survives through the arrival of Hal Jordan and Indigo-1, leader of the Indigo Tribe. Indigo-1 brings Sinestro to Korugar, so that he may finally confront Mongul. After a fierce battle, Sinestro activates the override systems in Mongul's rings, using them to imprison him inside the Sinestro Corps Central Power Battery, thus overthrowing Mongul, taking control of the Mongul Corps, and renaming it "The Sinestro Corps" after himself. When he departs with Hal Jordan's group of light-wielders, he commands his Corps to gather at Korugar and protect it while he is away.

In the aftermath of Blackest Night, the Sinestro Corps and Green Lantern Corps maintain a fragile truce where neither will attack each other. However, while helping Hal Jordan and the ring-wielders of the other five corps investigate the abduction of the emotional entities, Sinestro is separated from his ring and imprisoned in the Book of the Black, along with the other five members of the group, with Hal only just managing to escape with their rings. When Sinestro and the others escape, renegade Guardian Krona takes command of their rings, prompting Sinestro to attack Krona on his own, with the unexpected result that he is once again chosen as a Green Lantern.

The New 52
Returning to Korugar after the Guardians decide to leave him with the ring, Sinestro learns that his Corps have reverted to their brutal methods, terrorising and slaughtering the people of Korugar rather than ruling it, Sinestro creating a new Green Lantern ring for Hal Jordan albeit one that he can shut off at will so that Jordan can help him retake control of the Sinestro Corps, who now want him dead in the belief that his killer will become the new Sinestro Corps leader. After turning various Korugarian prisoners into a temporary Green Lantern Corps using short-lived duplicates of Sinestro's ring, Sinestro and Hal are able to hold off the Sinestro Corps long enough to drain the power away from the Central Power Battery of the Sinestro Corps, de-powering all of the Corps members on Korugar, although those more distant from the battery will still have access to their own power supplies. Later all Lanterns' rings registered that the Sinestro Corps have disbanded with 98% of all known Corpsmen dead or incarcerated, requiring Arkillo, who was cut off from the other Corps in the Orrery with the New Guardians during this attack, to use a new, independent power battery forged by the Weaponer from the fear of the Korugarians. It has since been revealed that the Guardians were responsible for Sinestro acquiring a Green Lantern ring in an attempt to undermine the Sinestro Corps as part of their future plans to destroy all seven Corps. During the conclusion of the "Wrath of the First Lantern" storyline, Sinestro becomes once again a member of the Sinestro Corps and after bonding with Parallax, he reactivates the yellow rings and releases all the Sinestro Corps members who were incarcerated on Oa.

During the events of Forever Evil after the Crime Syndicate had taken control of much of Earth, Batman revealed that he harbored a Sinestro Corps ring since the organization's attack on Earth as one of his weapons to deploy against the Justice League should they ever go rogue. When Batman and his allies at the time are attacked by Power Ring, Batman puts the Sinestro Corps ring on in an attempt to counterattack him. However, the ring's power is heavily depleted and Power Ring manages to get it off Batman's finger before ultimately being attacked by Sinestro himself, who was summoned to the planet by Batman's use of the ring. In a brief ensuing battle, Sinestro severs Power Ring's arm from his body, causing his ring to deem him unworthy and leave. As Power Ring thanks Sinestro for freeing him from the curse of the ring, Sinestro incinerates him.

In the aftermath of the war with the New Gods of New Genesis, Sinestro has created Warworld into the new base and headquarters of the Sinestro Corps, after the Green Lantern Corps have vanished into another universe.

DC Rebirth

Subsequently, in DC Rebirth, Sinestro uses the opportunity to establish the Sinestro Corps as the new force of 'order' in the universe, albeit through imposing fear rather than inspiring faith, with Soranik joining her father out of a lack of perceived options. However, as they establish a presence where Oa was once located, Hal Jordan forges a new ring for himself as the rest of the Corps return to this universe.

Sinestro then sends out his enforcers of his Corps to control the new order of the universe with fear. The Sinestro Corps attacks a planet, but soon Hal emerges and returns of being Green Lantern in the fight. Hal attacks with his full powers causing the Sinestro Corps members to flee as Hal pursuits them. He follows them on the planet, as all the Sinestro Corps are to restrain him. While Hal tried to battle them, the Sinestro Corps gain the full power of fear throughout the universe to defeat him, and were ordered by Sinestro to bring Hal alive. The Sinestro Corps return to the base with granting to Sinestro with the captured Green Lantern, who they thought was Hal, but is actually Guy Gardner instead. Furious and unhappy, Sinestro demands where Hal is. A Corps member named Strafe mistook that rebel of being Soranik Natu, who has secured Hal safely, though he was killed by Sinestro. The Sinestro Corps are used to capture the people of the universe and imprison them in Warworld's engine to increase the power of fear.

When Hal has recovered, he invades Warworld and attacks the Sinestro Corps. They were about to attack, but their leader Sinestro appears and orders his Corps to stop so that he and Hal can go face to face in battle. Before Sinestro attacks him, he discovers too late his powers are decreased due to Soranik rescuing people from being imprisoned and escapes with them. Hal then uses his energies as a living construct to incinerate the Fear Warlord, apparently destroying the Sinestro Corps' leader, and Ranx for good.

Prominent members

Like the Green Lantern Corps, the Sinestro Corps has 7200 ring bearers, two for each of the 3600 sectors of space.

Leadership
Thaal Sinestro (of Sector 1417): An anthropologist from the planet Korugar who was specializing in reconstructing the ruins of long-dead civilization when indoctrinated into the Green Lantern Corps by the Green Lantern Phrohl Gosgotha, who crash-landed in one of the ruins and died giving his green power ring to Sinestro, advising him to use it to defend himself from a Weaponer of Qward who pursued the Lantern. Taking Gosgotha's post, Sinestro became one of the greatest Green Lanterns alongside Abin Sur because of his desire for order, which eventually led him to the idea of secretly becoming a dictator on Korugar. However, this rule over his own planet was exposed to Sur's successor, Hal Jordan, who was helping him stop an attempted Khund invasion on Korugar. As a result, Sinestro was brought before the Guardians and banished to Qward. There, he plotted his revenge by allying himself with the Weaponers of Qward who created a yellow power ring for so he can face and outnumber the Guardians and the Green Lanterns as the leader and namesake of the Sinestro Corps.
Mongul (of Sector 2811): The son of a longtime foe of Superman also named Mongul. After the end of the war, he found a downed Sinestro Corps member and broke his neck, taking his ring for himself. Defeated by the Green Lantern Bzzd when he attacked him from within, flying out through his eye. Mongul was then thrown to the planet of the Black Mercys, where Mother Mercy intended to use his body as food for her children. He later broke free, and escaped the planet. He later took charge of the Sinestro Corps, attempting to turn Daxam, and later, Korugar into their new homeworld. However, Sinestro confronted him, and overrode his ring control, trapping him within the Sinestro Corps' central power battery.
Arkillo (of Sector 674): A feared warrior from the planet Vorn who became one of Sinestro's first recruits, acting as both drill sergeant and carnivore. Arkillo fought Mongul for control of the Sinestro Corps and lost, having his tongue ripped out and forced to wear it around his neck. His tongue was later restored by Saint Walker of the Blue Lantern Corps, who Arkillo grows somewhat attached to. Described by Geoff Johns as the "Kilowog of the Sinestro Corps." Arkillo appears in Green Lantern: New Guardians, acting as the representative of the Sinestro Corps. For a time Arkillo was the only active Sinestro Corps member prior to its rebirth.

Ring bearers
Anti-Monitor (of Sector -1): A supreme being titled 'The Guardian of Fear' who was responsible for the events of Crisis on Infinite Earths, the Anti-Monitor is an almost infinitely powerful threat. Returning in the wake of the events of Infinite Crisis and 52, he allies with Sinestro to form the Sinestro Corps. His agenda is the same as it was in the Crisis - to become sole overlord of the Antimatter Universe upon the destruction of all Matter universes. The Anti-Monitor is later discharged from the Corps.
Karu-Sil (of Sector 2815): A village girl from the planet Graxos III whose family was killed during a raid on her village, leaving her to fend for herself in the bordering jungle while being raised by animals. While helping her pack attack a boy from neighboring village, the Green Lantern Blish stopped them and delivered Karu-Sil (who he thought the pack was also attacking) to an institute on Graxos IV. However, it was the act of killing one of her psychologists there that she was bailed out of the orphanage by a yellow power ring and became a member of the Sinestro Corps. Karu-Sil was at one time captured by the Zamarons and trapped in a power ring conversion crystal. Before Fatality was released from her crystal, Karu-Sil's conversion was still shown as being incomplete. She has since been freed.
Despotellis (of Sector 119): A sentient virus created in a medical lab on the planet Khondra that can kill from within, responsible for the death of 85% of space sector 119 in addition to Kyle Rayner's mother. Despotellis was also responsible for infecting Mogo with a disease that drove several Green Lanterns (including Kilowog) mad when exposed to Mogo that got Guy Gardner framed for murder, though Isamot Kol gave Guy the benefit of the doubt having noticed earlier that something was strange on Mogo when he was seeking counseling and with Soranik Natu's help they were able to cure Mogo. Despotellis was defeated by Leezle Pon, a Green Lantern Smallpox Virus shortly after infecting Guy. It was last heard he was imprisoned on Oa.
Amon Sur (of Sector 2814): The son of deceased Green Lantern Abin Sur who became leader of the Black Circle Crime Syndicate until a battle against Kyle Rayner had him overthrown. Afterwards, he journeyed to Earth, plotting to steal his father's Green Lantern ring from Hal Jordan by hiring bounty hunters to find him. When he met the hunter who captured Jordan met up with Amon in the desert where Abin was buried, he betrayed Amon and revealed himself as John Stewart in disguise when Amon was about to use his weapon on Jordan in disgust to the fact that he was not worthy to have the ring. In the middle of the fight that followed, a yellow power ring appeared and welcomed Amon as a member of the Sinestro Corps, transporting him away from Earth. This yellow power ring had previously tried to recruit Batman as the Corps member for this sector, and following Amon Sur's death, it sought out the Scarecrow as its new bearer, but it was destroyed by the Guardians. He was recently revived as a member of the Black Lantern Corps. Through the combined attack of Hal Jordan and Indigo-1, his ring was destroyed, and his body reduced to ash.
Kryb (of Sector 3599): A hag from the planet Vora who kills Green Lanterns who are parents and stores their children in a cage growing out of her back. The other members of Rayner's team then attacked Kryb in the Sector House, causing an explosion which caused the Sector House's orbit to begin to decay and fall into the planet. Kryb was taken by Miri Riam to Zamaron and imprisoned in a power ring conversion crystal. She was freed during Sinestro's assault on Zamaron, and convinced Miri Riam to help her find her children, whose voices she could no longer hear. They discover that the children have become "Black Lantern Corphans", and are attacking the Oan Central Power Battery. When Red Lantern Guy Gardner attacked the children, Kryb attacked him, but he ripped off her arm and shoved it down her throat. She is later seen with the rest of the lanterns descending to protect the Earth from Nekron.
Tekik (of Sector 3281): A robot created on the planet Potter-59-3 that rebelled against its life of servitude, creating a "fear program" that infected every other robot on the planet. The planet never recovered from Tekik's attack, and has since been abandoned and renamed "the lost world". As a result, Tekik came to the attention of a yellow power ring that welcomed him into the Sinestro Corps.
Murr the Melting Man (Austin Snow) (of Sector 3490): A scientist from the asteroid outpost DW-426 who was changed by an accident with a power source into a mindless being whose touch can melt any other lifeform.
Romat-Ru (of Sector 2813): A Xudarian who is regarded to be one of the vilest creatures in the universe.
 Ampa Nnn (of Sector 3517): A serial killer from the planet Lythyl, who has a habit of removing the organs of his victims and meticulously cleaning them.
Superboy-Prime (of Sector 2813): A younger, alternate dimension version of Superman from Earth Prime and a main antagonist from Infinite Crisis.
 Bedovian (of Sector 3): a hermit crab-like cannibalistic sniper who can kill from three space sectors away. He was located and injured by John Stewart. He is shown in Green Lanterns Corp #46, helping to shoot a giant bullet with Dove inside to the Anti-monitor.
Low (of Sector 3308): The most dangerous parasite in the universe. Can drain every drop of blood out of nearly any being in seconds. Replicates by laying "eggs" in the bodies he kills, birthing up to a thousand parasitic slugs from a single carcass.
Enkafos (of Sector 2981): A strategist who coordinated the Sinestro Corps attack on Mogo and was ultimately killed by Sodam Yat. Ethan Van Sciver described Enkafos as an analogue to the Green Lantern Corps' Salaak. Recently revived as a member of the Black Lantern Corps.
 Batman (Bruce Wayne) (of Sector 2814): A yellow power ring attempted to induct him into the Sinestro Corps during the Sinestro Corps War but Batman managed to remove the ring from his finger causing the ring to fly off. Batman put on a Sinestro Corps power ring during the Forever Evil storyline in order to fight Power Ring thus becoming the Sinestro Corps member of Sector 2814 as a result.
 Borialosaurus (of Sector 3001): The oldest member of the Sinestro Corps and one of the only surviving members of a race of carnivorous sea animals from the Guardian's homeworld of Maltus that were hunted down after killing dozens of Guardians of the Universe.
Braach (of Sector 3064): A Selachian who feeds on the endangered space dolphins, attracting the attention of space dolphin lover Lobo.
Bur'Gunza (of Sector 3561): a seemingly model prisoner on Takron-Galtos. When his restraints were removed, he slaughtered forty-two guards before being brought down. He was killed by Bolphunga during the  riots. Recently revived as a member of the Black Lantern Corps.
Clark Kent / Superman (of Sector 2814) Superman became a Yellow Lantern for a while in the Injustice comics.
Devildog (of Sector 1567): A convicted murderer on at least 17 planets.
Duel Eknham (of Sector 3550): A Siamese-twin-like pair of doctors from the planet Sedas with two faces and personalities. One side wishes to kill and maim in the most gruesome ways possible, while the other prefers more sophisticated methods of murder. The Sinestro Corps Ring places itself on the hand of the violent side. The two are forced to serve Mongul in Green Lantern Corps #23. Annoyed with their constant bickering, Mongul uses his ring to separate the two. The violent side is killed by Guy Gardner, and the other side is torn apart by the other Lanterns' attack. Both sides are later seen reunited as members of the Black Lantern Corps. Their ring and body are destroyed by a joint attack from Hal Jordan and Carol Ferris. His name is derived from the reverse spelling of artist Doug Mahnke's last name.
Fatality (of Sector 1313): A longtime enemy of the Green Lantern Corps, Fatality was captured by the Zamarons and encased in a violet crystal designed to convert her power ring into a Star Sapphire ring. Fatality's conversion recently completed, and she is now a member of the Star Sapphires.
Feena Sik (of Sector 2897): A famous artist who discovered a ritual to bring her creations to life and slaughtered any living thing that's blood the ritual required, including her husband, earning her the attention of a yellow power ring.
Flash (of Sector 2814): After the Flash was possessed by Parallax during the Brightest Day he temporarily became the Sinestro Corps member of Sector 2814.
Flayt (of Sector 2751): A Power-ray from the planet Tristram, known for draining the power out of hundreds of passing starships, rendering them stranded.
Gleen (of Sector 312): One of the Kroloteans responsible for the transformations of Hector Hammond, Black Hand, and the Shark, and has tampered with the evolutionary patterns of over a thousand species. Amongst his species, Gleen is considered the cruelest and most twisted. He is annihilated by Alpha Lantern Varix when he attempts to break Sinestro out of his prison transport.
Gorgor (of Sector 3215) An expert tracker who tracked Sinestro to Earth after his leaders apparent "betrayal". Claimed he would get to rule the Sinestro Corps for killing Sinestro. Was killed and his ring destroyed.
Haasp the Hunter (of Sector 3492): Murderous brother of the Green Lantern Harvid. Imprisoned by his brother for illegal hunting, Haasp has made Harvid his next "big game".
Hal Jordan (of Sector 2814): A Green Lantern officer given a couple of yellow power rings during the Sinestro Corps War since his own ring had run low on power and he was unable to recharge it at the time, though it did not work out as planned. During the War of the Green Lanterns storyline, after being forced to remove his Green Lantern ring to prevent him from becoming the host of by Parallax again during the "War of the Green Lanterns", he chose Sinestro's ring due to his previous experience with using a Sinestro Corps ring.
Cyborg-Superman (Hank Henshaw) (of Sector 2814): The man-machine hybrid who destroyed Coast City, and eventual Grandmaster of the Manhunters. Although he works with the Sinestro Corps, he does so solely so that he can die; he is loyal to the Anti-Monitor alone knowing that he can kill him for once and for all. Henshaw is believed to be killed at the end of the Sinestro Corps War storyline only to have the Manhunters find him once again.
Horku (of Sector 2): Member of the same race as the Green Lantern Honnu. He was later killed by his counterpart near Mount Rushmore. Revived as a member of the Black Lantern Corps.
Imecsub: Purple-skinned, bug-eyed alien, captured by Sodam Yat and Arisia. While in a holding cell in Sector House 2815, he was crushed to death by the arrival of Sodam's mother's spacecraft. His name and appearance are derived from actor Steve Buscemi.
Kiriazis (of Sector 1771): A Sinestro Corps member who "blinds and tortures, splintering the Ring's beams with her prisms." She was later said to be able to use her spider-like physiology to metabolize the ring's energy and produce spider web out of it. Kiriazis was captured by the Zamarons and trapped in a power ring conversion crystal, but has since been freed.
Kretch (of Sector 3545): A demonic being from the planet Soh. Able to erupt into a massive supernova capable of engulfing entire cities.
Lex Luthor (of Sector 2814): After he stole the Scarecrow's Sinestro Corps power ring during the Blackest Night he temporarily becomes a member of the Sinestro Corps.
Lyssa Drak (of Sector 3500): Keeper of the Book of Parallax. After being imprisoned by the Green Lantern Corps, she goes searching for her Book. In her search, she finds the Book of the Black and (for lusting over it) is trapped inside its pages by Scar. She has since been freed, and defected the Sinestro Corps to join Krona
Lobo (of Sector 3500): In the New 52, after being given a bounty to kill Sinestro, he's given the opportunity to use his skills for the yellow lanterns
Maash (of Sector 863): Conceived as triplets, Maash was later fused into one body, with three faces stacked one on top of the other. The top head is an innocent personality, unable to stop the two more vicious personalities from controlling their shared body.
Mallow (of Sector 614): Head of a bloodthirsty group of marauders, whose hideout is in the centre of the worst asteroid storm in the universe.
Moose (of Sector 3333): A mammoth-like alien. His real name is unpronounceable, so his ring chose the closest approximation.
Narok (of Sector 2449): An alien with an Octopus-like lower body who, prior to joining the Corps, imprisoned his own sister and forced her to devour her children. He was killed by the Black Lantern Harbinger.
Peacemaker (of Sector 2) (the home sector of the Reach): Selected from Earth to join the Sinestro Corps, the alien Reach place a beetle scarab in his spine to make him a joint agent with the intention of assassinating Jaime Reyes, the Blue Beetle. However, with Blue Beetle's help, Peacemaker is able to resist the ring and the scarab, removing both.
The Quintet Squad: Five siblings (Ena, Pente, Tessera, Theo, and Tria), whose species cannot be identified by the Green Lantern's rings. They attacked the families of Green Lanterns, raining the eyes of their victims over Oa. Four of them were brought in by the Green Lanterns, except for Ena, one of the female siblings, who killed herself to avoid capture.
Ranx the Sentient City (of Sector 3272): An intelligent, free-floating robotic city that is prophesied to kill Mogo.
Scarecrow (Jonathan Crane) (of Sector 2814): A criminally insane college psychiatrist and recurring opponent of Batman who is selected by a duplicate of Sinestro's ring as a deputy to the Sinestro Corps during the Blackest Night crisis. Lex Luthor, overwhelmed by the orange light of greed, steals his ring.
Scivor (of Sector 3106): Once posed as a torture god of Aplic-Toh, influencing thousands to murder on his behalf. Possesses unmatched powers of persuasion.
Schlagg-Man (of Sector 3493) A native of the planet Bismoll, who had his teeth removed after biting through a policeman's neck. He has since had them replaced with Bismollian steel, allowing him to bite through anything. He was executed by the Alpha Lanterns and later revived as a Black Lantern.
Seer Ruggle (of Sector 2700): The Bomb Mistress of the planet Rorc, who is responsible for the construction of six blink bombs throughout the universe, one of which she gave to the Children of the White Lobe to destroy Mogo.
Setag Retss (of Sector 1155): Member of a race of under-reptiles that dwell in the dark waters of planets in the Rexulus system. His ring allows him to breathe outside of water.
Sirket (of Sector 1110): An insect that lives in the Bleed known as the space between dimensions.
Slushh (of Sector 3376): An acidic polymorphous globular being. His insides are composed of a corrosive fluid that liquifies flesh instantly. During the attack on Zamaron, black power rings revive the skeletal remains within Slushh, causing them to burst out, badly damaging his membrane.
Sn'Hoj (of Sector 3201): Known for attacking starships, assimilating their technology, and killing the crew.
Snap Trap (of Sector 3189): A humanoid crocodile who uses his hypnotic eyes to lure in his prey. He then devours the victim's spines, leaving them alive and in agony.
Smithwick (of Sector 1418): Belongs to the same race as Salaak, whom he has sworn to kill.
Stanch (of Sector 3560): A once benevolent being who was corrupted in body and mind through the pollution of his world, becoming a monstrous killer of the skies.
Starro: an alien parasite that creates copies of itself which take possession of sentient organisms and take control of their minds.
Tri-Eye (of Sector 3145): A fearsome traveling creature who uses his three mouths to tear his victims to pieces and devour them, leaving no trace left. He is executed by the Alpha Lanterns following the  riots and later revived as a Black Lantern. However, another virtually identical member of his species has been shown with the Sinestro Corps during and since the Blackest Night.
Ugg-I (of Sector 53): A female alien with an eye placed where a human mouth would be located and two mouths where human eyes would be located. She is killed by the Alpha Lanterns during the mass execution of the  prisoners on Oa. She was recently revived as a member of the Black Lantern Corps.
Vril Dox (of Sector 1287): While battling the Black Lantern version of his wife, Stealth, Dox was chosen by the slain Narok's ring to be his successor. He is later discharged from the Corps, following his repeated refusal to follow Sinestro's orders and go to Korugar.
The Weaponer (of Sector -1): The Weaponer created Sinestro's original yellow ring. He later lured Sinestro to Qward to destroy him. After he was defeated he accepted Sinestro's invitation to join his corps.
Yellow Lantern (of Sector 1284, an anagram of Sector 2814): A citizen of Bizarro World who is selected as a member of the Sinestro Corps. He ignores the ring's commands until the ring overrides his free will and takes him to the battlefield. Made a cameo in Green Lantern #25. This ring bearer is actually a Bizarro-version of Hal Jordan. A Bizarro version Kyle Rayner appeared in the first page of the 2009 DC Universe Halloween Special.
Bekka, of the New Gods:  A warrior of New Genesis, having encountered Sinestro in Sector 1014 and given an invitation. 
Several characters have been shown in preview art and mentioned by creators Geoff Johns and Ethan Van Sciver, but have yet to appear. Ethan van Sciver has also stated that there will be a 'Frankenstein'-inspired member who is two aliens cut in half and sewn together (with each one bearing a power ring, so that they are two bodies acting as one), and "Strange Little Robots". The "'Frankenstein'-inspired member" made a small appearance in the Sinestro Corps Special, appearing behind Sinestro. In the final installment of "The Sinestro Corps War", many unnamed members were seen during the fight scenes. Two resembled a Xenomorph and a Predator. Another resembled the Legion of Super-Heroes villain Validus, and another was of the Dominator race.

Oath
When recharging their power rings, members of the Sinestro Corps recite the following oath:

(*) "My power" becomes "his power" when recited by other members of the Corps.
(**) "Sinestro's might" became for a time "Arkillo's might", when Arkillo was the only active Sinestro Corps member prior to its rebirth.

Entity

As the embodiment of fear which is connected to the yellow light of the Emotional Spectrum, Parallax is revealed to be the emotional entity for the Sinestro Corps. Born when one of the earliest life forms first felt terror, it is insect-like in appearance. Parallax was the first of the seven entities to be captured by a still unknown person and currently is held captive in Ryut. The Sinestro Corps insignia is based on drawings created by life forms who looked into the mouth of Parallax, and lived to tell the tale.

Book of Parallax
This book apparently holds in its pages all the history of the greatest Sinestro Corpsmen histories. For unknown reasons the book was chained to Lyssa Drak with yellow energy from Sinestro himself. This was possibly for the need to have a historian for his Corps and a way for Sinestro to revisit his Corps' success. Lyssa Drak is quite loyal to Sinestro and highly devoted to updating the Book and keeping it safe. A power ring is needed to translate the Book's text into words familiar to the ring wielder. Before a candidate of the corps enters a fear lodge, their power rings are drained by the Book of Parallax. Recently, Lyssa Drak has become the embodiment of the book.

Weapons and equipment

Members of the Sinestro Corps use yellow power rings built on Qward. Though functionally similar to a Green Lantern's power ring, yellow power rings are fueled by fear instead of willpower. Members are selected for their skill at intimidation and terror. The ring amplifies the aggressive tendencies of the wearer. The yellow rings are charged by yellow power batteries, which are in turn linked to a yellow Central Power Battery based on Korugar. Aside from the recharging limitations common among the various Corps, their only known weakness is that their power can be drained by a Blue Lantern's power ring.

Other versions
 The Lightsmiths: In the universe prior to the current one, groups managed to tap into the wellspring of power created by the Emotional Spectrum. In this universe those who tapped into the yellow light were known as the Lightsmiths of the Yellow Light of Terror.
 In "Scooby-Doo Team-Up #12," The Mystery Inc gang battle the Legion of Doom and attempt to rescue the Superfriends. They fight multiple members of the legions including Lex Luthor, Gorilla Grodd, Bizarro, Cheetah, and Sinestro. Sinestro attempts to use his ring on Scooby-Doo and Shaggy; however, the ring leaves Sinestro and goes to Shaggy and Scooby, causing their costumes to change into those similar to the Sinestro Corps, due to their ability to instill great fear in themselves. Shaggy then uses his ring to rescue the heroes and defeat the villains.

In other media

Television
The Sinestro Corps appear in the Justice League Action episode "The Ringer", consisting of Sinestro and Despotellis.

Film
 The Sinestro Corps appear in a future prophecy depicted in the "Abin Sur" segment of Green Lantern: Emerald Knights, consisting of Sinestro, Arkillo, Lyssa Drak, Kryb, Maash, Karu-Sil, Romat-Ru, Slussh and Tri-eye.
 The Sinestro Corps appear in Green Lantern: Beware My Power, consisting of Lyssa Drak and Sinestro as prominent members and two minor unnamed members.

Video games
 The Sinestro Corps make a cameo appearance in Green Lantern's ending in Mortal Kombat vs. DC Universe.
 The Sinestro Corps appear in DC Universe Online.
 An alternate universe incarnation of the Sinestro Corps appear in Injustice: Gods Among Us, consisting of Sinestro and Hal Jordan. Additionally, Damian Wayne becomes a Yellow Lantern in his non-canonical arcade mode ending.
 The Sinestro Corps appear in Lego Batman 3: Beyond Gotham, with Sinestro and Arkillo appearing as playable characters while Batman's Sinestro Corps uniform appears as a downloadable alternate skin.

Miscellaneous
The Sinestro Corps appear in Smallville Season 11. This version of the group was created by Parallax and is served by the Manhunters as heralds. In the "Lantern" arc, Parallax possesses John Stewart and sends yellow power rings to Earth, where they choose Arkham Asylum inmates, such as Man-Bat, Firefly, Bane, Mr. Freeze, and Poison Ivy, before they are all defeated by Superman and the Green Lantern Corps and depowered by Dr. Emil Hamilton. In the "Chaos" arc, Lex Luthor employs a security force empowered by yellow power rings until they are defeated and depowered by Booster Gold and Skeets.

References

External links

Wizard Article on the members of the Sinestro Corps
Newsarama Sinestro Corp Preview

Comics characters introduced in 2006
DC Comics supervillain teams
DC Comics aliens
DC Comics extraterrestrial supervillains
Green Lantern characters
Characters created by Geoff Johns
Characters created by Ethan Van Sciver